Cloxacillin is an antibiotic useful for the treatment of a number of bacterial infections. This includes impetigo, cellulitis, pneumonia, septic arthritis, and otitis externa. It is not effective for methicillin-resistant Staphylococcus aureus (MRSA). It is used by mouth and by injection.

Side effects include nausea, diarrhea, and allergic reactions including anaphylaxis. Clostridium difficile diarrhea may also occur. It is not recommended in people who have previously had a penicillin allergy. Use during pregnancy appears to be relatively safe. Cloxacillin is in the penicillin family of medications.

Cloxacillin was patented in 1960 and approved for medical use in 1965. It is on the World Health Organization's List of Essential Medicines. It is not commercially available in the United States.

Mechanism of action
It is semisynthetic and in the same class as penicillin. Cloxacillin is used against staphylococci that produce beta-lactamase, due to its large R chain, which does not allow the beta-lactamases to bind. This drug has a weaker antibacterial activity than benzylpenicillin, and is devoid of serious toxicity except for allergic reactions.

Society and culture
Cloxacillin was discovered and developed by Beecham (now GlaxoSmithKline).

It is sold under a number of trade names, including Cloxapen, Cloxacap, Tegopen and Orbenin.

See also
 Dicloxacillin
 Flucloxacillin
 Nafcillin
 Oxacillin

References

External links 
 

Chloroarenes
Enantiopure drugs
Isoxazoles
Penicillins
World Health Organization essential medicines
Wikipedia medicine articles ready to translate